The Córas Iompair Éireann 611 class locomotives were delivered from the manufacturers, Motorenfabrik Deutz at Cologne, Germany between December 1961 and February 1962, entering revenue earning service in the following August after receiving the new tan / black paint job at Inchicore.  
Nos. 611 to 617 were a larger development of the earlier 601 class locomotives.
They went into traffic in various parts of the country, as shunting engines at smaller depots such as Dublin's North City Mills siding, and branch line duties such as between Attymon and Loughrea. They briefly appeared on the Limerick - Foynes mixed train service for a few months until that line was closed in 1963. Unlike the earlier 601 class, these locomotives were fitted with brake connections enabling them to work passenger trains. Apart from their journeys on the Foynes and Loughrea lines, they never hauled passengers anywhere else until preservation in Downpatrick, where all three preserved have served on public passenger trains.

With their original lightweight branch line haunts all closed, and therefore little to do, they were withdrawn from service between 1967 and 1977. Nos. 611, 613, 615, 616 and 617 were sold to Cómhlucht Siúicre Éireann (Irish Sugar Co.) in 1977. Four of these locomotives have been preserved, with the remaining three scrapped.

Model 
The 611 Class has been made as a 00 gauge brass kit by Worsley Works Models .

References

External links

Downpatrick & County Down Railway Preserved G611 Class
Irish Traction Group webpage for preserved G611
Irish Traction Group webpage for preserved G616
Irish Traction Group webpage for preserved G617*

Iarnród Éireann locomotives
Deutz locomotives
B locomotives
5 ft 3 in gauge locomotives
Diesel locomotives of Ireland
Railway locomotives introduced in 1962